"Basketball" is the fifth and penultimate episode of the first season of the American comedy television series The Office. The episode aired on NBC in the United States on April 19, 2005. The episode was written and directed by producer Greg Daniels, marking both his first solo writing credit and first directing credit for the series. This episode also marks the first appearance of comedian Patrice O'Neal.

In this episode, Michael Scott (Steve Carell) and the office staff take on the workers in the warehouse in a basketball game. Owing to racist and sexist stereotypes, Michael chooses many less-skilled office workers for the team over their more athletically talented peers. Michael claims a "flagrant personal intentional foul," stops the game, and declares his team as the winners. The warehouse finds the call unfair and Michael caves under pressure and concedes the victory to the warehouse staff.

The episode was inspired by a deleted scene from the first episode where Michael talks about a pick-up basketball game. For two days, the cast of The Office played actual basketball games, which were then spliced together to give the effect of one continuous game. In addition, several lines from the episode became fans and cast favorites. "Basketball" was viewed by an estimated 5.0 million viewers and received a 2.4/6% rating share among adults between the ages of 18 and 49. The episode received positive reviews from critics.

Synopsis

Michael Scott (Steve Carell) comes into work prepared to pit the office staff against the warehouse in a game of basketball, with the losers having to work on Saturday. Michael picks Jim Halpert (John Krasinski), Ryan Howard (B. J. Novak), and Stanley Hudson (Leslie David Baker), the last of whom he believes possesses significant basketball skills based on a racial stereotype. In addition, he also reluctantly picks Dwight Schrute (Rainn Wilson) and Phyllis Lapin (Phyllis Smith), but refuses to pick Oscar Martinez (Oscar Nunez) or Kevin Malone (Brian Baumgartner).

The game begins and Stanley proves to be a horrible player. Furthermore, Michael cannot make a shot, nor is he a fan of passing or defending. Upon gaining possession of the ball, Michael fools around and intentionally acts stupid to tease the opponents, which results in Roy Anderson (David Denman) snatching the ball and scoring against Michael's team. Despite the fact that Michael is the one who foolishly lost the ball, he blames the scoring on his teammates' ineptitude. Jim switches with Michael on defense and defends Roy. As Jim begins to show his prowess at the game, Roy and Jim gradually become aggressive toward each other, with Pam Beesly (Jenna Fischer) looking on. At a crucial point in the game, Michael is accidentally hit in the face and claims it is a "flagrant personal intentional foul". He pettily stops the game and declares the office winners since they were winning when the foul occurred. The warehouse finds the call unfair and Michael caves under pressure, conceding the victory to the warehouse staff. As everybody returns to work, Kevin demonstrates his excellent shooting skills.

Afterwards, Michael, in a rare moment of heart, tells the office that they do not have to come in on Saturday either. However, his justification does little to calm them: "Like coming in an extra day is going to prevent us from being downsized."

Production

"Basketball" was written and directed by producer Greg Daniels. Although he wrote the episode, Daniels was not originally scheduled to direct "Basketball." Rainn Wilson remarked that he really pushed for Daniels to direct the episode. John Krasinski applauded Daniels for being the first writer to "take [the characters] out of the office". Daniels later said that his favorite shot from the episode was when Michael takes Ryan on a tour of the warehouse because "you got to see the whole basketball [set]". The editors' cut for the episode was 40 minutes long. During the commentary for the episode, Steve Carell argued that the American version of The Office was more difficult to shoot because the British version was 29 minutes long, whereas the American version could only be 22 minutes.

The inspiration for the episode was a deleted scene from the pilot episode where Michael talks about a pick-up basketball game. During filming, the cast and crew were filmed playing real basketball games for two days. The takes were then spliced together to make it appear as if only one game had taken place. NBC was worried about the episode because several of their other pilots had done basketball episodes. The network put a lot of pressure on the cast and crew to make the episode appear "as realistic as it could be". Donald Lee Harris designed the warehouse set, which Krasinski described as "amazing" and "detailed".

Several of the actors had basketball experience, such as Krasinski, who played for his high school team. Brian Baumgartner, who portrays Kevin, actually succeeded in making 14 free-throw shots, of which several were included in the final footage. Steve Carell later said of his basketball skills, "The thing about looking like you're bad at basketball is, it's like anything else, you have to be incredibly good in order to look bad […] but that's not the case with me and basketball. I just was bad." However, Carell joked that he would "kick ass" at a hockey episode, a reference to his real-life hockey skills.

"Basketball" contained several lines that became fan and cast favorites. Two of Michael's lines, "The hand strikes and gives a flower" and "Blessed be those who sit and wait" were described by Wilson as Confucian and biblical, respectively. Carell joked that Michael Scott himself should self-publish a book of inspirational sayings. Jenna Fischer revealed that her line, "Please don't throw garbage at me" was her favorite line of the first season. Michael's line, "Try not to be too gay on the court" was improvised by Carell and Krasinski's reaction was real, as he had no idea Carell was going to say it.

Reception

Ratings
In its original American broadcast on April 19, 2005, "Basketball" was viewed by an estimated 5.0 million viewers and received a 2.4/6% rating share among adults between the ages of 18 and 49. This means that it was seen by 2.4% of all 18- to 49-year-olds, and 6% of all 18- to 49-year-olds watching television at the time of the broadcast. The episode, airing after Scrubs, retained 92 percent of its lead-in audience.

Reviews
The episode received moderately positive reviews from critics. Travis Fickett from IGN retroactively gave the episode a 7.5 out of 10, signifying a "good" episode. Fickett commented that "Basketball" was stylistically different from most of the other episodes in the fledgling series, pointing to its lack of a sub-plot and its characterization of Michael Scott. Fickett, when discussing the latter, singled out the moment wherein Michael hurts Phyllis' feelings by telling her she can't play basketball, writing, "The moment is played mostly straight–and it does feel more realistic and uncomfortable and in that way, the show leans more towards the feel of the UK series. It's a great moment, but feels like a different show." Overall, he wrote that, "There is still quite a bit of funny stuff [in 'Basketball'], but in many ways, this episode suggests what the show would have been like had it taken a slightly different direction in terms of tone and style." Miss Alli from Television Without Pity gave the episode an "A−". Jenna Mullins from E! News referred to "Basketball" as her "all-time favorite episode of The Office" in an article about Steve Carell's last episode of the series.

Not all reviews were as positive, however. Erik Adams of The A.V. Club awarded the episode a "C+" and highly criticized the characterization of Michael. Largely, he felt that Michael's antics made him out to be a jerk because the series has not worked at showing that he truly "isn’t a complete asshole". Adams noted that Michael "could truly force Darryl and his staff to work on Saturdays, and he truly could fire them for winning the basketball game. But that would be an outrageous abuse of legitimate power, which isn’t funny." Ultimately he argued that the basketball scenes went on for too long; he said the "episode’s original cut ran too long to air, and it’s obvious where the basketball scenes boxed out other threads of the episode".

References

External links
"Basketball" at NBC.com

The Office (American season 1) episodes

fr:Le Match de basket